Wall Street Warriors is a documentary and reality TV series that details the lives of various Wall Street entrepreneurs. A MOJO HD channel original series, each episode is 30 minutes long and shot in high definition video. Currently two seasons have aired and a third season is in production.  MOJO HD recently announced it will be going dark in December, 2008 and it is uncertain which network will air the current season of the series.

Featured Wall Streeters
Season One began airing in October 2006 and had six episodes.  It featured the following people:

Season Two began airing in January 2008 and had ten episodes.  It featured the following people:

List of episodes

Season 1

Season 2

Season 3

External links
 Wall Street Warriors Where Are They Now?

2006 American television series debuts
2000s American reality television series
Trading television shows